Hamilton College is a private liberal arts college in Clinton, New York. It was founded as Hamilton-Oneida Academy in 1793 and was chartered as Hamilton College in 1812 in honor of inaugural trustee Alexander Hamilton, following a proposal brought forward after his death in 1804. Hamilton has been coeducational since 1978, when it merged with its coordinate sister school Kirkland College.

Hamilton is an exclusively undergraduate institution, enrolling 2,000 students in the fall of 2021. Students may choose from 57 areas of study, including 44 majors, or design an interdisciplinary concentration. Hamilton's student body is 53% female and 47% male, and comes from 45 U.S. states and 46 countries. Hamilton places among the most selective colleges in the country, with an 11.8% acceptance rate. Athletically, Hamilton teams compete in the New England Small College Athletic Conference.

History

Hamilton began in 1793 as the Hamilton-Oneida Academy, a seminary founded by Rev. Samuel Kirkland, a Presbyterian minister, as part of his missionary work with the Oneida tribe. The seminary admitted both white and Oneida boys. Kirkland named it in honor of Treasury Secretary Alexander Hamilton, who was a member of the first Board of Trustees of the Hamilton-Oneida Academy. It was first located in Whitestown, New York, incorporated by the New York Board of Regents in 1793, and received its charter from them in 1812. A visitor in 1799, who refers to the school as a seminary, reported that there were "fifty-two students of both sexes under the care of two instructors". By 1825 it had moved to Clinton.

The academy became Hamilton College in 1812, making it the third oldest college in New York after Columbia and Union, after it expanded to a four-year college curriculum.

By the end of the nineteenth century, its colorful ninth President M. Woolsey Stryker distanced Hamilton from the Presbyterian Church (although he was a minister of that denomination and published many hymns), and sought to make it a more secular institution.

In 1978, the all-male Hamilton College merged with the women's Kirkland College, founded by Hamilton across the road in the 1960s. The merger provoked controversy, particularly since Hamilton refused to provide assistance with Kirkland's debts. Hamilton publicly justified the merger as prompted by its desire for co-education. The merger took nearly 7 years to complete; women could still receive a Kirkland diploma instead of a Hamilton diploma until 1979.

The original Hamilton campus is often called the "light side" or "north side" of campus. The original side of campus was once called "Stryker Campus" after its former president, Melancthon Woolsey Stryker (misspelled "Striker Campus"). On the other side of College Hill Road, the original Kirkland campus is called the "dark side" or the "south side".

Since the 1970s, Hamilton has been a member of the New England Small College Athletic Conference (or the NESCAC) (despite technically being outside New England). This conference also includes Amherst, Bates, Bowdoin, Colby, Connecticut College, Middlebury, Trinity, Tufts, Wesleyan, and Williams. Rivalries with many of these schools, Middlebury in particular, predate the conference.

In 2002, then-President Eugene Tobin resigned after admitting that he had failed to give proper attribution to quoted material in speeches.

Also, in 2002, Professor Robert L. Paquette complained when an independent student group brought Annie Sprinkle, an actress and former porn-star, as a speaker. Paquette later led an attempt to create an Alexander Hamilton Center on campus, but it was unsuccessful. The center, renamed the Alexander Hamilton Institute for the Study of Western Civilization, subsequently opened in an off-campus facility located in the village of Clinton.

Campus
Among the more recent developments are the Taylor Science Center, the largest construction project in the college's history (2005); the Charlean and Wayland Blood Fitness and Dance Center (2006); major expansion and renovation of the Kirner-Johnson Building (2009); the Sadove Student Center at Emerson Hall (2010); the Ruth and Elmer Wellin Museum of Art (2012); and the Kevin and Karen Kennedy Center for Theatre and the Studio Arts (2014). Hamilton's athletic facilities include an ice rink, swimming pool, several athletics fields, a golf course, a three-story climbing wall, and a ten-court Squash Center. The college was listed as a census-designated place in 2020.

Daniel Burke Library

The Daniel Burke library was completed in 1972 at a cost of more than $5.5 million and designed by architect Hugh Stubbins. It holds 500,000 volumes in approximately 80,000 square feet. The library houses the Information Commons and Information Technology Services, and includes a variety of print and electronic materials.

Kirner-Johnson Building

The Kirner-Johnson Building, or KJ, is home to Hamilton's social science departments, the Arthur Levitt Public Affairs Center, the Nesbitt-Johnson Writing Center and the Oral Communication Center. The building has a large, naturally-lit, two-story commons that is a popular gathering place for students to study or socialize between classes. In order to create a space that allows for both activities, the inner point of the commons features four small waterfalls that provide just enough white noise to encourage conversation while acoustically insulating those who prefer to study. In 2004, planning for the renovation and expansion of the Kirner-Johnson building received an Award of Merit from the American Institute of Architects. The project was completed in 2008.

Carol Woodhouse Wellin Performance Hall
The 700-seat hall hosts the College Orchestra conducted by Heather Buchman, Hamilton College Choir and College Hill Singers, Jazz Band, and Faculty Dance Concerts as well as guest artists from around the globe.

Ruth and Elmer Wellin Museum of Art
The Ruth and Elmer Wellin Museum of Art is the college's public art museum that also serves as a teaching resource for its students. Exhibits have included contemporary and historical paintings, photography, art and culture, and student exhibitions. The museum building was designed so that the exhibit areas, archives, art storage, conservation workshops, administrative offices, and teaching spaces are all visible to museum visitors. Students are involved many aspects of the museum's functions and the building features classrooms for art and art history courses.

The Sage Rink
Hamilton College's Sage Rink, built in 1921, is the oldest indoor collegiate hockey rink in America. Northeastern University's Matthews Arena is the oldest rink in America for a collegiate team; however, it was originally built as a commercial arena and not purchased by the university until 1979. Sage was financed by the widow of industrialist Russell Sage, whose name graces a number of Central New York college edifices, including Russell Sage College. In addition to Continental men's and women's teams, youth hockey, high school teams, adult amateur efforts and the famous Clinton Comets, who dominated the semi-professional Eastern Hockey League in the 1960s and early 1970s, have played at the Sage Rink. It was renovated in 1993, when it got better lighting, ice-making equipment, and structural enhancements. The rink houses the college's Men's and Women's varsity and club hockey teams, physical education classes, and local youth hockey games.

Litchfield Observatory

At Litchfield Observatory (obs. code: 789), pioneering German–American astronomer Christian Peters discovered some 48 asteroids. The observatory burned down but is currently marked on campus by its telescope mount outside of the Siuda Admissions and Financial Aid House. The current observatory, a quarter of a mile from campus, is powered by solar energy and is open for student use. The existing observatory, located 100 feet from College Hill Road, was built with rock from the same quarry as the original building.

Hamilton College Chapel
The Hamilton College Chapel is a historically protected landmark and is the only three-story chapel still standing in America.

Kirkland Cottage
The cottage was believed to be the original residence of Samuel Kirkland when he began his missionary work to the Oneida, though some scholars have argued it was built years after Kirkland moved to the area. The cottage is completely original, although it was moved from its original location on Kirkland's property (known today as Harding Farm) to its current place on the main quadrangle of the Hamilton Side. The cottage is currently used for matriculation ceremonies.

Buttrick Hall, the birthplace of Elihu Root
At one time serving as the residence of the Oren Root family, the house was the birthplace of Elihu Root, who served as Secretary of State and War and won the 1912 Nobel Peace Prize. Built in 1812, the house served as the student dining hall for Hamilton College. In 1834 it was adapted as a residence for Horatio Buttrick, superintendent of the Buildings and Grounds Department and college registrar. After his daughter married Oren Root, he allowed the young couple to take over the house. Their son Elihu Root was born there. The house has since been renamed Buttrick Hall. It serves as office space for the President of the college and the Dean of Faculty.

Elihu Root House
The Elihu Root House originally belonged to Elihu Root, who used it as his summer house. It was next used by the Office of Admission. As of September 2009, it housed the Dean of Students Office, the Registrar, and the department of Residential Life.

Days-Massolo Center
In 2011, Hamilton opened the Days-Massolo Center with the goal of promoting diversity awareness and fostering dialogue among the wide variety of cultures represented on campus. The center is dedicated to trustees Drew S. Days III and fellow Hamilton trustee Arthur J. Massolo.

The Root Glen
The Root Glen is a wooded garden on the campus of Hamilton College. The walking area is a result of three generations of the Root family, who are known for their work in scholarships, diplomacy, and art collecting. The Root Glen is a walk along formal gardens and forest trails.

The Homestead, a building named and bought by Oren Root in the 1850s, was built adjacent to the Root Glen. Oren and his wife Grace decided to plant various trees, shrubs, and flowers around the building. Then Oren's son Elihu Root inherited the property, and the Roots expanded the gardens. In 1937 Edward Root took over the garden from his father. Grace Root established the Root Glen Foundation after her husband died, which was established to use the land for educational purposes and to promote interest in the study of birds. In 1971, the foundation dissolved and Grace decided to give ownership to Hamilton College. The Root Glen is now maintained by the horticultural grounds staff of the college, and an advisory committee is responsible for the selection of new shrubs and flowers as needed.

The Root Glen contains over 65 species of trees, dozens of shrubs, and a wide variety of flowers. Located on the south side of the Glen is a display of trees and plants native to the area.

Academics
Hamilton currently offers the Bachelor of Arts (stylized A.B or B.A.) degree for 55 areas of study. Hamilton also participates in engineering dual-degree programs with the Columbia School of Engineering and Applied Science at Columbia University and the Thayer School of Engineering at Dartmouth College. Its most popular majors, based on 2021 graduates, were:
Economics  (81)
Biology/Biological Sciences (39)
Political Science and Government (34)
Research and Experimental Psychology (27)
Mathematics (22)

Hamilton is well known for its flexible curriculum, for which there are no distribution requirements. Beyond the courses required for a concentration, students have near total freedom over their course selection. While there are no distribution requirements, students do have to complete a quantitative and symbolic reasoning requirement, which can be fulfilled through courses in a variety of departments, and a writing requirement, for which students must take at least three writing intensive courses.

Additionally, Hamilton students may study abroad. The college administers programs in China, France, and Spain, as well as domestic programs in the Adirondacks, New York City and Washington, D.C.

The college has long adhered to an academic honor code. Every student matriculating at Hamilton must sign a pledge to observe the honor code and many examinations are not proctored.

Hamilton has been part of the SAT optional movement for undergraduate admission since 2002. Hamilton offers applicants different ways to meet their standardized testing requirements, including a choice of the SAT I, the ACT, or a combination of three SAT Subject Tests.

Admissions
For the Class of 2025 (enrolling fall 2021), Hamilton received 9,380 applications and accepted 1,320 (14.1%), and 533 enrolled. The Class of 2025 is 50% women, 50% men; 32.6% students of color from the U.S. and 7.3% international.

Rankings

The annual ranking for 2021 by U.S. News & World Report categorizes Hamilton as "most selective" in admissions and ranks the college tied for ninth overall and tied for 28th in "Best Undergraduate Teaching" among "National Liberal Arts Colleges". Forbes in 2019 rated it 59th in its America's Top Colleges ranking of 650 schools, which includes military academies, national universities and liberal arts colleges, and 25th among liberal arts colleges.

Kiplinger's Personal Finance places Hamilton 11th in its 2019 ranking of best value liberal arts colleges in the United States. Hamilton is ranked 17th in a similar measure by U.S. News & World Report.

Student life and traditions
The current Hamilton College campus consists of the combined Hamilton and Kirkland College campuses. It has three large wooded areas, known as the Root glen, Rogers glen, and the Kirkland glen.

In the mid-1990s, the administration required all underclassmen to live on campus in college housing rather than in fraternity or sorority houses, ultimately resulting in the closure of all fraternity houses and the Emerson Literary Society's house in 1995. It created new social spaces for student use, improved funding for on-campus events, and pursued several other social life changes. The new policy was controversial, especially the administration's decision to prohibit the fraternities from using their houses. Thus, the majority of fraternities concluded they had no choice but to sell their houses to the college, though some fraternities refused to sell their houses until well into the next decade. As the college purchased the houses, it has carried out extensive renovations, in order to turn the buildings into dormitories. The college has revoked or suspended the charters of a few fraternities for extreme behavior, as recently as 2015, because of their causing additional controversy among the students and alumni.

Housing
Nearly all students live in college-owned dorms. The residence halls have a variety of styles, including former fraternity houses, suites, apartment style housing, co-ops and traditional dormitory-style housing. Hamilton offers a cooperative living option to students, as well as substance-free and quiet housing.
All residence halls are co-ed; some have single-sex floors. In October 2010, the college adopted a gender-neutral housing policy, wherein students of either sex may room together in rooms designated for two or more students.

Societies
Eight fraternities, four sororities, and one co-ed society are active on the Hamilton College campus. Greek organizations maintain a significant (but not overwhelming) social presence, despite being non-residential. These fraternities include two of the "Union Triad", Sigma Phi and Delta Phi. They consist of Alpha Delta Phi (founded at Hamilton College), Chi Psi, Delta Chi, Delta Kappa Epsilon, Delta Upsilon, Psi Upsilon, and Tau Kappa Epsilon. Theta Delta Chi disbanded in 2015 following a suspension by the president of the college.

The sororities are Alpha Theta Chi, Gamma Xi, Kappa Sigma Alpha, and Phi Beta Chi.

Hamilton is also the home of two Nationally Recognized Latino Greek organizations, Lambda Upsilon Lambda fraternity and Sigma Lambda Upsilon sorority. 

While all of the fraternities on campus are affiliated with national organizations, the sororities are unique to Hamilton. Lambda Chi Alpha existed at Hamilton until 1958, when the local chapter, Gamma Eta Zeta, left the national organization in a dispute over the admission of a black member. Gamma Eta Zeta became an independent fraternity called Gryphon, which remained in existence for more than 20 years.

Generally, events sponsored by Greek organizations occur on campus and are open to all students. Hamilton also has a co-ed, non-Greek social society: the Emerson Literary Society.

Campus media
WHCL-FM - During the academic year, Hamilton students, faculty, and community members produce a variety of music, news, sports, and talk radio programs at FM frequency 88.7. The station is available through most of the Mohawk Valley region and online at whcl.org. It is the only radio station in Clinton.

The Hamilton College Spectator, known simply as The Spectator or the Spec on campus, is Hamilton College's primary weekly news publication. It is distributed in the campus dining halls, mail center, and library. The Spectator covers campus, local, and national news as well as Hamilton sports and campus life. The paper can be found online. The earliest Hamilton College literary magazine, The Talisman, appeared between 1832 and 1834. Another student publication, The Radiator, which The Spectator marks as its origin, appeared in 1848. A weekly publication, The Radiator described itself as, "A Weekly Miscellany of General Literature, Science, and Foreign and Domestic Intelligence". The publication was a collection of short stories, historical sketches, poetry and news excerpts gathered from both foreign and domestic news outlets. The college yearbook, The Hamiltonian was first published in 1858. The literary journal, The Hamilton Literary Monthly, began publication in 1866. The Campus, which was published between 1866 and 1870, was succeeded in 1899 by another campus newspaper, Hamilton Life. In 1942, Hamilton Life was succeeded by Hamiltonews, and in 1947, Hamiltonews became The Spectator.

Enquiry is a weekly publication published by the Alexander Hamilton Institute's undergraduate fellows. The publication features political editorials and essays by Hamilton College students.

The Monitor is a bi-weekly publication started in 2015 that features student essays and editorials pertaining to politics, current events and social justice.

The Duel Observer is a weekly humor and satire publication. Founded by Tom Keane '03, David Schwartz '02, and James Robbins '05, it has adopted the format of a parody newspaper (e.g., The Onion). The name refers to the duel between Aaron Burr and Alexander Hamilton which resulted in Hamilton's death.

The Daily Bull is a daily bulletin that caters to campus counterculture. It is noted for being printed on yellow legal size paper, and is distributed on dining hall tables every morning.

The Continental is a student-run magazine published a few times a semester; it features fashion advice, party photos, and articles on a variety of subjects.

Red Weather is the college literary magazine, dedicated to promoting the literary arts on campus by printing a variety of student-authored poetry and fiction; it is published twice a year.

The Green Apple is named for one of the symbols of Kirkland College; it features short stories, poetry, and op-eds, and is printed on green legal-sized paper.

Event traditions

Class and Charter Day
On the last day of spring term classes, all afternoon classes are canceled for a campus wide picnic and party. Additionally, a ceremony is held during which students, faculty, and other members of the Hamilton community are recognized for their academic, leadership, and community-development accomplishments. Class and Charter Day is also the biggest party day of the year at Hamilton. The popular "G-Road" party which took place on this day became so infamous for underage drinking and over-indulgence that the college chose to ban the party for Class and Charter Day '09. The college instead provided a free concert for the student body, coordinated by the Student Activities Office and the student-run Campus Activities Board. Concerts have included groups such as The Chainsmokers, Passion Pit, Galantis, White Panda, Sammy Adams, and Macklemore. The concert featured co-hosts WHCL-FM and Social Traditions until 2019 (another student-run organization).

Citrus Bowl 
The Citrus Bowl is the first men's hockey home game of the season. Traditionally the game was called the Orange Bowl, and upon the first Hamilton-scored goal, oranges that students had smuggled into the rink were thrown onto the ice at the visiting goalie. This often resulted in a delay-of-game penalty against Hamilton while the ice was cleaned. In recent years, the orange throwing has been banned by the college administration and by NESCAC officials, but the event is still well attended. Orange T-shirts commemorating the event have been distributed in recent years.

FebFest
Rooted in the long-standing tradition of the winter carnival at Hamilton, FebFest is a relatively recent revival. A week-long combination of performances, parties, free food, fireworks, and various other events, FebFest intends to keep student morale high during the winter. Over the years, bands ranging from the Steve Miller Band to Ghostface Killah have performed as a part of festivities.

May Day Music Festival
Started in 2004, May Day is an outdoor music festival sponsored by several on-campus organizations, including the Hamilton College Independent Music Fund, WHCL, and the Hamilton College Campus Activities Board. Past performers have included: Citizen Cope, The New Pornographers, The Pharcyde, Dead Meadow, Tim Reynolds, Chromeo, Jennifer Gentle, Rainer Maria, Ted Leo, The Unicorns, J-Live, Catch-22, and Sleater-Kinney. The name refers to the fact that the festival is staged in early May or late April. In recent years as the Class and Charter Day Concert, also held near the end of the spring semester, has become tradition a separate May Day Music Festival has ceased activity.

HamTrek
Begun in 2004, HamTrek is an annual sprint-triathlon consisting of a 525-yard swim, 9-mile bike ride, and 3.1-mile run. Participants can compete individually, in unisex teams of 3, or co-ed teams of 3. Prizes are awarded to the winners of the different competing groups. In the late 2000s, HamTrek introduced a fundraising component to benefit the Shawn Grady Memorial Fund. Also, many athletic coaches now require their teams to compete. HamTrek takes place on Class and Charter Day.

Reunions
Every June, alumni, faculty and friends of the college take over the Hamilton campus for an extended weekend of parties, lectures, panel discussions, performances, hikes, games and happy hours.

Athletics

Hamilton is an NCAA Division III school and has been a member of the New England Small College Athletic Conference since 1971. The college sports teams are known as the Hamilton Continentals. Hamilton sponsors 29 sports, including: Baseball (M), Basketball (M&W), Crew (M&W), Cross Country (M&W), Field Hockey (W), Football (M), Golf (M&W), Ice Hockey (M&W), Lacrosse (M&W), Outdoor and Indoor Track & Field (M&W), Soccer (M&W), Softball (W), Squash (M&W), Swimming & Diving (M&W), Tennis (M&W), Volleyball (W).

Before the 1993–94 academic year, Hamilton's sports teams could not participate in any national postseason tournaments. The rule was changed that year, allowing Hamilton to participate in Division III tournaments in various sports. On May 18, 2008, Hamilton won its first NCAA championship, when its women's lacrosse team defeated Franklin & Marshall 13–6 in the finals of the NCAA tournament.

About 35% of Hamilton's student body participate in its varsity athletic programs. In addition to varsity sports, Hamilton sponsors several club and intramural sports. Club sports include alpine skiing, curling, equestrian, figure skating, men's rugby, women's rugby, tae kwon do, ultimate frisbee, and women's golf. In 2008 the men's rugby team placed fourth in the national Division III tournament.

Hamilton's mascot is a Continental, a soldier in America's Continental Army of the Revolutionary War. The college's colors are buff and blue, likely derived from the colors of the 1779 Continental Army's New York regimental coats, which were blue with buff facings. The college's eponym, Alexander Hamilton, played a central role in the Continental Army as General George Washington's Chief of Staff. At many sporting events, Hamilton is represented by the Al-Ham (an abbreviation of Alexander Hamilton) pig. The pig, large, anthropomorphic, and dressed in a Hamilton basketball jersey and a Continental soldier's tricorn hat, was introduced in the early 2000s in an attempt to boost school spirit and interest in Hamilton's athletics programs.

Rocking Chair Classic:
Hamilton's football rivalry with Middlebury College dates to 1911. Since 1980, the annual football game between Hamilton and Middlebury has been designated the Rocking Chair Classic. The winning team keeps the Mac-Jack Rocking Chair during the following year. The rivalry has been dominated by Middlebury, which has won the last 14 matches.

Demographics
Hamilton typically enrolls about 1,900 students; in 2019 47% are male and 53% are female. About 60% of students come from public schools, and 40% come from private schools. Hamilton's 2019 students come from 45 U.S. states and 46 countries. A recent year reported that 5% of Hamilton students were described as international, 5% as African-American, 1% as Native American, 8% as Asian/Pacific Islander, 4% Hispanic, 70% White, and 9% as unknown ethnicity.

Alumni and faculty

Notable Hamilton alumni include (chronologically listed):

 U.S. Congressman, abolitionist activist, and philanthropist Gerrit Smith (valedictorian, 1818)
 Dean of Columbia Law School and first president of the University Club Theodore William Dwight (1822)
 Railroad entrepreneur and executive Perry H. Smith (1846)
 U.S. Congressman, Senator and Governor of Connecticut Joseph Roswell Hawley (1847)
 U.S. Secretary of State and Nobel Peace Prize laureate Elihu Root (1864)
 27th U.S. Vice President James S. Sherman (1878)
 Pharmaceutical entrepreneur William McLaren Bristol (1887)
 Pharmaceutical entrepreneur John Myers (1887)
 Poet Ezra Pound (1905, Honorary Doctorate 1939)
 Drama critic and Algonquin Round Table member Alexander Woollcott (1909)
 Pioneering advertising executive Alex Osborn (1909), credited with the creativity technique brainstorming
 Jurist and diplomat Philip Jessup (1919)
 Influential psychologist and social philosopher B. F. Skinner (1926)
 Pathologist Lauren Ackerman (1927)
 Diplomat Sol Linowitz (1935)
 Sexuality researcher William Masters (1938)
 Prize-winning neuroscientist Paul Greengard (1948)
 Award-winning writer Thomas Meehan (1951)
 The Bank of New York president J. Carter Bacot (1955)
 Civil rights leader Bob Moses (1956)
 Delaware governor Michael Castle (1961)
 Novelist Terry Brooks (1966)
 Procter & Gamble CEO A.G. Lafley (1969)
 Tony Award-winning playwright Richard Nelson (1971)
 U.S. Secretary of Agriculture and Iowa governor Tom Vilsack (1972)
 Pulitzer Prize-winning composer Melinda Wagner (1979)
 Cornell Law School professor William A. Jacobson (1981)
 Netflix co-founder Marc Randolph (1981)
 Civil rights advocate Mary Bonauto (1983)
 Investment banker and Goldman Sachs CEO David Solomon (1984)
 Novelist Amanda Filipacchi (1988)
 Actor and writer for The Office Paul Lieberstein (1989)
 Election and voting rights attorney Marc Elias (1990)
 Legendary Pictures CEO Thomas Tull (1992)
 College basketball head coach Kyle Smith (1992)
 Actress Sarah Rafferty (1993)
 Academy Award nominated director Yance Ford (1994)
 Novelist Kamila Shamsie (1994)
 Academy Award-winning screenwriter and actor Nat Faxon (1997)
 Real estate broker and television personality Ryan Serhant (2006)
 Novelist Sarah J. Maas (2008)

Notable enrollees who did not graduate include the abolitionist Theodore Weld and actors Peter Falk and Tony Goldwyn.

Prominent fictional alumni include the newspaper editor Charles Webb from the Thornton Wilder play Our Town.

Notable faculty have included philosophers such as Leo Strauss; writers such as Natalie Babbitt, Alex Haley and poet Howard Nemerov; composers such as Jay Reise; and diplomats and politicians such as Edward S. Walker, Jack F. Matlock Jr. and Bernie Sanders.

See also
 Papyrus Oxyrhynchus 74
 Papyrus Oxyrhynchus 78

References

External links

 

1793 establishments in New York (state)
Educational institutions established in 1793

Universities and colleges in Oneida County, New York
Liberal arts colleges in New York (state)
Buildings and structures in Oneida County, New York
Private universities and colleges in New York (state)
Clinton (village), New York